Ysaura Candelaria Viso Garrido (born 17 June 1993) is a Venezuelan footballer who plays as a forward for Chilean club Colo-Colo and the Venezuela women's national team.

International career
Viso represented Venezuela at the 2010 FIFA U-17 Women's World Cup. At senior level, she played two Copa América Femenina editions (2010 and 2018) and the 2018 Central American and Caribbean Games.

International goals
Scores and results list Venezuela's goal tally first

Honours and achievements

Clubs
Atlético Huila
Copa Libertadores Femenina: 2018

Individual
Copa Libertadores Femenina top scorer: 2011 and 2014

References

1993 births
Living people
Women's association football forwards
Venezuelan women's footballers
Venezuela women's international footballers
Caracas F.C. (women) players
Unión Magdalena footballers
Atlético Huila (women) players
Independiente Santa Fe (women) players
Colo-Colo (women) footballers
Venezuelan expatriate women's footballers
Venezuelan expatriate sportspeople in Austria
Expatriate women's footballers in Austria
Venezuelan expatriate sportspeople in Colombia
Expatriate women's footballers in Colombia
Venezuelan expatriate sportspeople in China
Expatriate women's footballers in China
ÖFB-Frauenliga players